Josh Reginald Hazlewood (born 8 January 1991) is an Australian international cricketer. He is a tall pace bowler known for his accuracy and has been compared to former Australian paceman Glenn McGrath. Hazlewood currently ranks no.2 in ODI, no.1 in T20I and no.12 in test in the ICC Men's Player Rankings. He was a part of the Australian side that won both 2015 Cricket World Cup and 2021 ICC Men's T20 World Cup .

Early career

Hazlewood was raised in the small country town of Bendemeer, New South Wales, situated 40 km north of Tamworth. He is the younger son of Trevor and Anne Hazlewood, having an older brother and sister. He would frequently engage with his older brother in fierce backyard cricket matches, and by the age of 12 was already playing for Tamworth against grown men. Hazlewood was selected for New South Wales at the age of 17, making him the youngest paceman to represent the state. His first-class debut was at the Sydney Cricket Ground against the touring New Zealand side in November 2008. Hazlewood also became the youngest to make his One Day International debut for Australia on 22 June 2010.

A right arm fast bowler, he has also played for Australia Under-19s and was the youngest member of Australia's squad for the 2008 Under-19 World Cup.

T20 franchise career
In February 2020, in the 2020 IPL auction, he was bought by the Chennai Super Kings ahead of the 2020 Indian Premier League.

In the 2022 Indian Premier League Mega auction, Josh Hazlewood was bought by the Royal Challengers Bangalore for ₹7.75 crores.

International career

He bowled 7 overs on his One Day International debut and picked up one wicket for 41 runs. He made his T20I debut vs West Indies on 13 February 2013 and picked up 1–36 in 4 overs. He picked career best figures 4–30 in a T20 vs England.

He made his Test match debut for Australia against India at the Brisbane Cricket Ground on 17 December 2014. He took 5 wickets in the first innings, conceding 68 runs. He was a part of the Australian squad for the 2015 ICC Cricket World Cup and played a part in their triumph, picking up 4 wickets against Pakistan in the quarter-finals.

In November 2015, Hazlewood became the first player to achieve the player of the match award in a day-night Test match ever. In this match against New Zealand, he took the first ever wicket in day-night Test by lbw Martin Guptill. He also took the first five-wicket haul in day-night Test cricket history with the figures of 6 for 70, en route to reaching 50 career wickets in just his 12th Test, faster than Shane Warne, Glenn McGrath and Mitchell Johnson.

In January 2017, Hazlewood recorded an unusual innings in the first ODI against New Zealand. He had a 26-minute long 54-run tenth wicket partnership with Marcus Stoinis without facing a single ball. He was run out at the non-striker's end with Australia falling just seven runs short of a win and he became the first player to be dismissed for a diamond duck in a partnership of over fifty runs. This was Hazlewood's first ODI dismissal, setting the record for the most ODI matches played without being dismissed (33), a record he had overtaken in December 2016 after his 28th ODI. Hazlewood picked up nine wickets in the Champions Trophy that year while topping the ICC ODI bowlers' rankings.

In April 2018, he was awarded a national contract by Cricket Australia for the 2018–19 season.

In July 2019, he was named in Australia's squad for the 2019 Ashes series in England. Hazlewood played in 4 of the 5 matches of the series, taking 20 wickets at an average of 21.85.

On 16 July 2020, Hazlewood was named in a 26-man preliminary squad of players to begin training ahead of a possible tour to England following the COVID-19 pandemic.
 On 14 August 2020, Cricket Australia confirmed that the fixtures would be taking place, with Hazelwood included in the touring party.

Hazlewood took his 200th Test wicket against India in the first Test of Border–Gavaskar Trophy series 2020–21. He is Australia's 17th highest Test wicket taker as of 19 December 2020. In August 2021, Hazlewood was named in Australia's squad for the 2021 ICC Men's T20 World Cup. In 2021 after the T20 World Cup, he became the first bowler to be ranked among top 10 in all three formats (Test,ODI,T20) in ICC rankings.

Hazlewood was selected in Australia's squad in the 2021-22 Ashes series, where he played the first test match in Brisbane only, taking three wickets and two catches. He was named as stand-in captain for a rested Pat Cummins during the second ODI against England in November 2022.

Achievements
 Named in ICC Men's T20I Team of the Year for the year 2021.

References

External links

 
Josh Hazlewood at Cricket Australia
Josh Hazlewood at Cricbuzz

1991 births
Australia One Day International cricketers
Australia Test cricketers
Australia Twenty20 International cricketers
Australian cricketers
Cricketers at the 2015 Cricket World Cup
Cricketers from New South Wales
Cricketers who have taken five wickets on Test debut
Living people
New South Wales cricketers
People from Tamworth, New South Wales
Sydney Sixers cricketers
Chennai Super Kings cricketers
Australian cricket captains